The Battle of Bukit Timah (10–12 February 1942), was part of the final stage of the Empire of Japan's invasion of Singapore during World War II.

Battle
On 8 February 1942, the Japanese landed a large force on the western side of Singapore Island. Throughout the following days, further troops were landed and heavy fighting followed as they pushed the mainly Australian defenders from the 22nd Brigade back from their positions on the coast. On 10 February further landings were made against the northern positions occupied by the 27th Brigade between the River Kranji and the Causeway, and steadily the British and Commonwealth lines were pushed back south-east towards the centre of the island.

As the Japanese began advancing towards the strategically important Bukit Timah which offered vital supplies including water, British, Indian, and Australian troops from a variety of units fought actions along the Bukit Timah Road in an effort to blunt the advance. As the Japanese 5th Division, with armoured support, advanced down the Choa Chu Kang Road, British troops and Chinese volunteers from the irregular Dalforce engaged in desperate hand-to-hand fighting, but being poorly equipped, they were forced back and by midnight the Japanese had occupied Bukit Timah.

On 11 February, two British brigades attempted a counter-attack, but this was turned back; the following day, the Japanese Imperial Guards, outflanked the British positions from the north, and forced them to withdraw. Dalforce was engaged in further fighting, which resulted in heavy Japanese casualties; in revenge the Japanese killed a large number of Chinese civilians nearby after the fighting.

See also
History of Singapore
Battle of Singapore
Japanese order of battle during the Malayan Campaign
Malaya Command

References
Citations

Bibliography

Further reading
 

Conflicts in 1942
1942 in Singapore
British rule in Singapore
Military history of Singapore
World War II operations and battles of the Southeast Asia Theatre
Bukit Timah
Battles of World War II involving the United Kingdom
Battles of World War II involving Australia
February 1942 events